Melhem Zain (born 21 October 1982) is a Lebanese singer

Career 
When he was 16, Melhem Hussein Zein first participated in an Amateur Singing Program called Kaas Al Nojoum (The Cup of the Stars) on the Lebanese LBC Channel for singing Mohammed Abd El Wahhab's "Ya Jarat Al Wadi" (The Neighbor of the Valley).

He came in third in Super Star 1, the Pan-Arab version of Pop Idol.

Personal life 
Melhem is married to Tamani Ali Salem al Beidh, the daughter of Ali Salem al Beidh. He has four children.

Discography 
2004 Enti Msheetee
2006 Badde Hebbik
2008 Aallawah
2012 Melhem Zein 2012
2017 El Jereh Elli Baadou

Singles 
2015 "Lama El Haki" For the Lebanese movie called Shi Yom Rah Fell
2015 "Andak Hiwaii"

References 

1982 births
Living people
Lebanese people of Arab descent
Idols (franchise) participants
21st-century Lebanese male singers
SuperStar (Arabic TV series)
Lebanese Shia Muslims
Lebanese people of Iraqi descent
Contestants from Arabic singing competitions